The 2011 National Invitation Tournament was a single-elimination tournament of 32 
NCAA Division I teams that were not selected to participate in the 2011 NCAA tournament. The 74th annual tournament began March 15 on campus sites ended on March 31 at Madison Square Garden in New York City. Wichita State defeated Alabama, 66–57, to win its first NIT title.

Participants

Automatic qualifiers
The following teams are automatic qualifiers for the 2011 NIT field; by virtue of winning their conferences' regular season championship and not qualifying for the NCAA tournament as an "at-large" bid.

At-large bids
The following 18 teams were also awarded NIT berths.

Seeds

Bracket
Played on the home court of the higher-seeded team.
(except #1 Boston College & #3 Dayton in the first round)
* – Denotes overtime

Alabama bracket

Colorado bracket

Boston College bracket

Virginia Tech bracket

NIT Final Four
Played at Madison Square Garden in New York City

See also
 2011 Women's National Invitation Tournament
 2011 NCAA Division I men's basketball tournament
 2011 NCAA Division II men's basketball tournament
 2011 NCAA Division III men's basketball tournament
 2011 NCAA Division I women's basketball tournament
 2011 NCAA Division II women's basketball tournament
 2011 NCAA Division III women's basketball tournament
 2011 NAIA Division I men's basketball tournament
 2011 NAIA Division II men's basketball tournament
 2011 NAIA Division I women's basketball tournament
 2011 NAIA Division II women's basketball tournament
 2011 College Basketball Invitational
 2011 CollegeInsider.com Postseason Tournament

References

National Invitation Tournament
National Invitation Tournament
2010s in Manhattan
Basketball in New York City
College sports in New York City
Madison Square Garden
National Invitation Tournament
National Invitation Tournament
Sports competitions in New York City
Sports in Manhattan